Douglas Lima (born 31 March 1932) is a Brazilian water polo player. He competed in the men's tournament at the 1952 Summer Olympics.

References

External links
 

1932 births
Living people
Brazilian male water polo players
Olympic water polo players of Brazil
Water polo players at the 1952 Summer Olympics
People from Manaus
Sportspeople from Amazonas (Brazilian state)